Ankudinovo is a rural locality (a village) in Pekshinskoye Rural Settlement, Petushinsky District, Vladimir Oblast, Russia. The population was 216 as of 2010. There are 6 streets.

Geography 
Ankudinovo is located on the Peksha River, 37 km northeast of Petushki (the district's administrative centre) by road. Logintsevo is the nearest rural locality.

References 

Rural localities in Petushinsky District